Ichthyophis beddomei is a species of caecilian in the family Ichthyophiidae. This species is distributed widely in the Western Ghats in southern India. The nominal species might be a composite of several cryptic species. It is also known as the yellow-striped caecilian, Beddome's caecilian,  or Nilgherries caecilian.

Description
The body is dark violet-brown, becoming light brown ventrally. A yellow lateral stripe runs from the head to the tail tip. The stripe becomes slightly wider at the neck. The upper lip and lower jaw are also yellow in colour. The eyes are distinct. The tentacles are placed very close to the lip and almost equidistant from the eyes and nostrils. The nostrils at the tip of the snout are visible from above. The upper jaw slightly overhangs the lower jaw.

Habitat and conservation
Ichthyophis beddomei is a subterranean species associated with leaf-litter, humus, and soil substrates. It lives in wet evergreen tropical forest but can also occur in low-intensity agricultural areas and in plantations. It is an adaptable species that can be locally abundant, but severe habitat destruction remains a potential threat. It probably occurs in several protected areas.

References

beddomei
Amphibians of India
Endemic fauna of the Western Ghats
Amphibians described in 1880
Taxa named by Wilhelm Peters